The University of Missouri–Kansas City School of Law is a public law school located on the main campus of the University of Missouri-Kansas City in Kansas City, Missouri, near the Country Club Plaza.

It was founded in 1895 as the Kansas City School of Law, a private, independent law school located in Downtown Kansas City, and was purchased by the University of Missouri-Kansas City in 1938. The law school moved to UMKC's main campus soon after, where it is accredited by the American Bar Association and is a member of the Association of American Law Schools.

Rankings
The school is ranked #114 best law school in the U.S., placing it in the third tier according to the four tier system of law schools based on the U.S. News & World Report Annual Rankings (2023 rankings). In 2017, the U.S. News & World Report ranked the Trial Advocacy Program as number 21 in the nation, tied with Stanford University, University of Georgia, University of Houston, and Campbell University (North Carolina). UMKC School of Law has repeatedly been ranked as a "Best Value Law School" by The National Jurist. In the Fall 2017 of preLaw Magazine, UMKC was given an A− designation on the list of "Best Value Law Schools." In the Winter 2018 issue of preLaw Magazine, a National Jurist publication, UMKC School of Law was ranked A− on the list of Best Schools for Trial Advocacy. In Spring 2018, UMKC School of Law was recognized as a top Upper Midwest School for its Entrepreneurship and New Venture Creation course and entrepreneurship concentration. In the same issue, it was given an A− on the list of "Best Schools of Practical Training." The law school was also given an A− in Intellectual Property and Tax Law and B+ in Technology Law. In April 2018 a student team from UMKC was recognized as National Champion and also won the Best Draft Award at the Transactional LawMeet, the leading transactional moot court competition for law school students. UMKC School of Law Continuing Legal Education (CLE) program was ranked the #1 traditional CLE program provider in the state of Kansas by the Kansas CLE Commission (Missouri does not have these rankings for CLE).

History
It is one of four law schools in Missouri (St. Louis University School of Law, University of Missouri Columbia School of Law, Washington University School of Law). It is one of seven American law schools to have had both a President of the United States (Harry S. Truman) and a Justice of the Supreme Court of the United States (Charles Evans Whittaker) attend.  Truman attended but did not graduate from the law school and never practiced law.  However,  Truman served as the presiding judge at the historic Truman Courthouse in Independence, MO. The other schools that have had President-Supreme Court graduates who practiced law are Yale Law School, Harvard Law School, Columbia Law School, the University of Virginia School of Law, the University of Cincinnati College of Law, and the Albany Law School. In February 2017, UMKC received forty linear feet of private papers for Justice Charles Evan Whittaker from the U.S. Supreme Court Archive. The archivist is curating these documents at the Miller Nichols LaBudde Special Collections Library.

Clinics
Eight clinical programs permit students, acting under faculty supervision, to develop legal skills and learn professional values in actual practice settings:
Abandoned Housing Clinic
Advocacy Master Class
Appellate Practice (Unemployment) Clinic
Child & Family Services Clinic
Death Penalty Clinic
Entrepreneurial Legal Services Clinic
Guardian Ad Litem Workshop
Intellectual Property Clinic
Kansas City Tax Clinic
UMKC Innocence Project/Wrongful Convictions Clinic

Publications
The UMKC Law Review
Journal of the American Academy of Matrimonial Lawyers

Employment 
According to UMKC School of Law's official 2017 ABA-required disclosures, 74.07% of the Class of 2017 obtained full-time, long-term, bar passage required ten months after graduation. The same 2017 ABA-required disclosures reports that 89.62% of the Class of 2017 obtained bar passage required or J.D. advantage positions. UMKC School of Law's Law School Transparency under-employment score is 23%, indicating the percentage of the Class of 2016 unemployed, pursuing an additional degree, or working in a non-professional, short-term, or part-time job ten months after graduation.

Costs
Tuition and fees for 2017-2018, full-time, first year law students who are Missouri residents: $19,038/year. Non-resident fees are an additional $16,318, but many students qualify for non-resident fee scholarships that allow them to pay the in-state rate while they establish Missouri residency. The approximate cost of attendance (including the cost of tuition, fees, and living expenses) at UMKC School of Law for the nine-month academic year for a typical first-year, Missouri resident, law student living off campus is $34,488.

Notable alumni

Politics

Edwin J. Brown (class of 1899), Mayor of Seattle
Barbara Allen (class of 1985), Kansas politician
Edward F. Arn (class of 1932), 32nd Governor of Kansas
James P. Aylward (class of 1908), Missouri politician associated with the Tom Pendergast political machine
William M. Boyle (class of 1926), Chairman, Democratic National Committee (1949–51)
Hilary A. Bush (class of 1932), Lieutenant Governor of Missouri (1961–65)
George H. Combs, Jr. (class of 1921), Missouri politician
Scott Ferris (class of 1901), Oklahoma politician
Jolie Justus (class of 1998), Missouri politician
Clarence M. Kelley (class of 1940), Director of the Federal Bureau of Investigation (1973–78)
Wesley Lloyd (class of 1906), U.S. Representative from Washington
Susan Montee (class of 2000), State Auditor of Missouri (2007–present)
Edward H. Moore (class of 1900), U.S. Senator from Oklahoma (1942–49)
Jim Polsinelli (class of 1969), founder Polsinelli law firm 
William J. Randall (class of 1936), Missouri politician
Katheryn Shields (class of 1978), Jackson County, Missouri Executive (1995–2006)
Roger C. Slaughter (class of 1932), Missouri politician
Harry S. Truman (attended), 33rd President of the United States (1945–53); 34th Vice President of the United States (1945); U.S. Senator from Missouri (1935–1945)
Sarah Lucille Turner (class of 1922), one of the first two women elected to the Missouri General Assembly

Judiciary
Bower Slack Broaddus (class of 1910), Judge, United States District Courts for the Western District of Oklahoma, Eastern District of Oklahoma, and Northern District of Oklahoma (1940–49)
Wesley E. Brown (class of 1933), Judge, United States District Court for the District of Kansas (1962–2012) (was oldest serving federal judge at 103 years old)
Gary A. Fenner (class of 1973), Judge, United States District Court for the Western District of Missouri (1996–present)
Zel Fischer (class of 1988), Judge, Supreme Court of Missouri (2008–present)
Fernando J. Gaitan Jr. (class of 1974), Judge, United States District Court for the Western District of Missouri (1991–present)
Shelby Highsmith (class of 1958), Judge, United States District Court for the Southern District of Florida (1991–2002) 
Rubey Mosley Hulen (class of 1914), Judge, United States District Court for the Eastern District of Missouri (1943–56)
Charles Henry Leavy (class of 1912), Judge, United States District Court for the Western District of Washington (1942–51)
Arthur Johnson Mellott (class of 1917), Judge, United States District Court for the District of Kansas (1947–57)
Ross Rizley (class of 1915), Judge, United States District Courts for the Western District of Oklahoma, (1956–69)
Edward D. Robertson, Jr. (class of 1977), Judge, Supreme Court of Missouri (1985–98) (Chief Justice, 1991–93)
Ortrie D. Smith (class of 1971), Judge, United States District Court for the Western District of Missouri (1995–present)
Melissa Taylor Standridge (class of 1993), Justice, Kansas Supreme Court (2020–present)
Arthur Jehu Stanley, Jr. (class of 1928), Judge, United States District Court for the District of Kansas (1958–71)
Dean Whipple (class of 1965), Judge, United States District Court for the Western District of Missouri (1987–2007)
Ronnie L. White (class of 1983), Judge, Supreme Court of Missouri (1995–2007) (Chief Justice, 2003–05)
Charles Evans Whittaker (class of 1924), Associate Justice, U.S. Supreme Court (1957–62)

Business and practice
Lyda Conley (class of 1902), first woman admitted to the Kansas Bar and first Native American woman to argue before the U.S. Supreme Court; championed Native American causes
Jay B. Dillingham (class of 1935), president of the Kansas City Stockyards and president of the Chambers of Commerce for both Kansas City, Missouri, and Kansas City, Kansas.
Donald Fehr (class of 1973), Executive Director, Major League Baseball Players Association (1986–2009) and National Hockey League Players Association (2010–)
Thomas Calloway Lea, Jr. (class of 1898), noted Texas criminal lawyer
Bob Stein (class of 1973), Kansas City Chiefs American football player; youngest person ever to play in a Super Bowl

Sports

 Mike Racy (J.D. class of 1992) – former NCAA vice president (1993–2013); 5th commissioner for the Mid-America Intercollegiate Athletics Association
Bob Stein (born 1948), American football linebacker, College Football Hall of Fame, Jewish Sports Hall of Fame, Super Bowl champion, played for the Kansas City Chiefs, Los Angeles Rams, Minnesota Vikings, and San Diego Chargers graduated in the top 10% of the UMKC Law School.

Notable faculty and former faculty

William K. Black
William Patterson Borland
Pasco Bowman II
Robert Klonoff
Kris Kobach
Henry L. Jost
Steve Leben
Albert L. Reeves
Kevin Warren

References

External links

Educational institutions established in 1895
Universities and colleges in Kansas City, Missouri
Law schools in Missouri
Law
1895 establishments in Missouri